The Tapajos antpitta (Myrmothera subcanescens) is a species of bird in the family Grallariidae.

It is found in Brazil. In 2018, the South American Classification Committee of the American Ornithological Society split this species from the thrush-like antpitta.

Its natural habitat is subtropical or tropical moist lowland forest.

References

Tapajos antpitta
Birds of the Amazon Basin
Tapajos antpitta